Ho Wan Tung (born 29 May 1996), also known as Toni Ho Wan Tung or Toni Ho,  is a Hongkonger footballer who plays as a defender for Scottish club Queen's Park. She is also a futsal player, and represented Hong Kong internationally in both football and futsal.

Club career
Ho Wan Tung played for Kitchee SC in Hong Kong before joining Queen's Park  of the Scottish Women's Premier League in October 2020.

International career
Ho Wan Tung has been capped for Hong Kong at senior level in both football and futsal. In football, she represented Hong Kong at two AFC U-19 Women's Championship qualifications (2013 and 2015), two AFC Women's Olympic Qualifying Tournament editions (2016 and 2020), the 2017 EAFF E-1 Football Championship and the 2018 AFC Women's Asian Cup qualification.

In futsal, Ho Wan Tung played for Hong Kong at the 2015 AFC Women's Futsal Championship.

See also
List of Hong Kong women's international footballers

References

1996 births
Living people
People from Kowloon
Hong Kong women's futsal players
Hong Kong women's footballers
Women's association football defenders
Hong Kong women's international footballers
Scottish Women's Premier League players
Hong Kong expatriate sportspeople in Scotland
Hong Kong expatriate footballers
Expatriate women's footballers in Scotland
Queen's Park F.C. (women) players